The Australia Post Keypass identity card is a photo identity card issued by Australia Post and can be used by people who do not have an Australian drivers licence or identity photo card, or for those who would prefer not to carry around a passport to prove their identity for safety and/or wear/tear reasons. It can additionally be used in a situation in which multiple proofs of ID are required, such as when opening a bank account.  To apply, you must be aged 17 years and 11 months, although you won't be able to use the card until you are 18.  

An under 18 Keypass used to be offered but this is no longer available as of 2022.  

Australia Post claims that the card can be used as proof of identity in all states. It is a legitimate form of ID and is technically acceptable as proof of ID when entering licensed (alcohol-serving) venues or buying from packaged liquor stores and tobacco vendors. One key advantage of Keypass, unlike most identity photo cards and driver licences, is the card can be issued to visitors to Australia.

Digital Keypass 18+ is also available on a smart phone through Australia Post Digital iD.

The cost of the Australia Post Keypass ID Card is as follows:

Regular price: $39.95

Concession: $29.95 (eligible government concession cards must be cited) 

NT Resident: $25.00

See also
 Australian state and territory issued identity photo cards
 Australian drivers licence

References

Identity documents of Australia